Honest Moyo (born 29 October 1991) is a Zimbabwe Bulawayoan footballer who plays as a defender for TS Sporting and the Zimbabwean national football team.

Career
In March 2019, Moyo joined TS Sporting in South Africa.

References

External links

1991 births
Living people
Highlanders F.C. players
TS Sporting F.C. players
Zimbabwe Premier Soccer League players
Zimbabwean footballers
Zimbabwe international footballers
Association football defenders